Chasm is a Metroidvania video game developed and published by Bit Kid, Inc. for Microsoft Windows, macOS, Linux, PlayStation 4 and PlayStation Vita in July 2018, the Nintendo Switch in October 2018, and the Xbox One in November 2018.

Gameplay 
Inspired by Castlevania: Symphony of the Night, Chasm tells the story of an aspiring knight eager to prove their worth, on a quest to a mining town whose resources are essential. Although the story is the same for all players, the exact layout of the world map is unique for each adventure, through the game's use of procedural generation combined with handmade room sequences. Combat (also similar to Castlevania) gives the player an option of a melee weapon and a sub-weapon to do most of your damage. As the players venture down into the mine, they can level up, collect new weapons from swords to whips, and use artifacts which make the environment explorable in different ways for new areas. The boss fights in the game rely on memorizing attack patterns. Besides that, there are rooms with moving or disappearing platforms, environmental hazards and traps, making a balance between combat and platforming. On the journey, there are townspeople trapped in cages. Releasing them sends them back up to the town, with a shop or service offered in the process, and unlocks a new sidequest expanding on the service they offer. Each map is segmented into themed sections like catacombs and gardens.

Development 
Initial development started in 2012 with a prototype. The main character was only able to fight and jump, and his design barely changed since then.  Maryland, USA-based studio Bit Kid, Inc. hoped they could sell the idea of an old-fashioned game to publishers at the Game Developers Conference, but nobody offered to fund the game. The team decided to crowdfund the game instead through Kickstarter in 2013, which was successful.

Reception 

Critical reception for the PC version of Chasm was mixed to positive. Jeremy Peeples of Hardcore Gamer called it "one of the finest Metroidvanias ever created." Tom Marks of IGN said "Chasm is a lovely and fun Metroidvania with a lot of cool new ideas, even if its randomized maps are uninteresting." Writing for GameSpot, Tom McShea said "Chasm is a well-crafted adventure" and praised its "superb combat and visual design."

References

External links 
 

2018 video games
Indie video games
Metroidvania games
Linux games
MacOS games
Microsoft XNA games
Windows games
PlayStation 4 games
PlayStation Vita games
Nintendo Switch games
Single-player video games
Video games developed in the United States
Xbox One games
Kickstarter-funded video games